Clinton Robert Irwin (born April 1, 1989) is an American professional soccer player who plays as a goalkeeper for Minnesota United.

Early life
Irwin attended high school at Charlotte Christian School. As a student, he played basketball, where he was a teammate of future NBA player Stephen Curry.

Irwin attended Elon University, where he made 54 appearances for the Elon Phoenix over four seasons.

Club career
While attending university, Irwin played two seasons with USL Premier Development Division club Carolina Dynamo.

After his time at Elon, Irwin joined Capital City of the Canadian Soccer League for the 2011 season. Irwin made 22 appearances for Capital City and scored a goal for the club in a 2–2 draw with Windsor Stars.

Following his stint with Capital City, Irwin joined his hometown club, the Charlotte Eagles in the USL Professional Division. On July 6, 2012, Irwin made his debut in a 2–0 win over the Charleston Battery

In February 2013, Irwin signed with Major League Soccer club Colorado Rapids after a successful trial in preseason. He made his debut for the club on March 16 in 1–1 draw against Real Salt Lake, coming on as a 7th minute substitute for Matt Pickens.

Following the 2015 season, in February 2016, Irwin was traded to Toronto FC in exchange for targeted allocation money, a third-round pick in the 2016 MLS SuperDraft and a conditional first-round pick in the 2017 MLS SuperDraft. After featuring as the club's starting goalkeeper for the first part of the season, Irwin sustained in injury in July, and as a result, he was replaced by his deputy Alex Bono in the starting line-up by manager Greg Vanney; Upon his return to action, Irwin later regained the starting spot for the remainder of the regular season and the Playoffs, as Toronto went on to reach the 2016 MLS Cup Final. In the final, held at BMO Field on December 10, Toronto were defeated by the Seattle Sounders 5–4 on penalties, following a 0–0 draw after extra time; Irwin was able to stop Álvaro Fernández's spot kick during the shootout, but misses from teammates Michael Bradley and Justin Morrow ultimately proved to be decisive. On December 13, 2016, Irwin was selected by Atlanta United FC in the third round of the 2016 MLS Expansion Draft, but was immediately traded back to Toronto for Mark Bloom and allocation money.

The following season, Irwin suffered a hamstring injury in the Toronto FC's home opener, a 0–0 draw against Sporting Kansas City; as a result, Bono was once again promoted to the starting line-up in Irwin's absence, and eventually established himself as the team's outright first-choice shot-stopper by September 2017, due to his performances, even after Irwin's return from injury. In a rematch of the previous season's MLS Cup Final, on December 9, Toronto defeated Seattle 2–0 at home to capture the 2017 MLS Cup, and complete an unprecedented treble of the MLS Cup, the Supporters' Shield, and the Canadian Championship.

On December 14, 2018, Irwin was traded back to the Colorado Rapids in exchange for a second-round pick in the 2019 MLS SuperDraft. He spent the 2019 season as the backup to former United States international Tim Howard. Irwin's contract with Colorado expired following the 2022 season.

On December 6, 2022, Minnesota United announced it had signed Irwin to a two-year contract, beginning in 2023, in support of starting goalkeeper, Dayne St. Clair.

Career statistics

Club

Honors

Club
 Toronto FC
 MLS Cup: 2017
 Supporters' Shield: 2017
 Canadian Championship: 2016, 2017, 2018

References

External links
 
 Elon University bio

Living people
1989 births
American soccer players
Soccer players from Charlotte, North Carolina
Charlotte Christian School alumni
Association football goalkeepers
Elon Phoenix men's soccer players
North Carolina Fusion U23 players
Charlotte Eagles players
Colorado Rapids players
Toronto FC players
Toronto FC II players
Colorado Springs Switchbacks FC players
Colorado Rapids 2 players
Minnesota United FC players
USL League Two players
Canadian Soccer League (1998–present) players
USL Championship players
Major League Soccer players
Major League Soccer All-Stars
MLS Next Pro players
American expatriate soccer players
Expatriate soccer players in Canada
American expatriate sportspeople in Canada